USS Solomons (CVE-67) was the thirteenth of fifty s built for the United States Navy during World War II. She was the first Navy vessel named after the Solomon Islands campaign, a lengthy operation that most famously included the Guadalcanal campaign, albeit she was not the first named Solomons. The ship was launched in October 1943, commissioned in November, and served in anti-submarine operations during the Battle of the Atlantic, as well as in other miscellaneous training and transport missions. Her frontline duty consisted of four anti-submarine patrols, with her third tour being the most notable, when her aircraft contingent sank the  during her third combat patrol. She was decommissioned in August 1946, being mothballed in the Atlantic Reserve Fleet. Ultimately, she was broken up in 1947.

Design and description

Solomons was a Casablanca-class escort carrier, the most numerous type of aircraft carrier ever built, and was designed specifically to be rapidly mass-produced using prefabricated sections, in order to replace heavy early war losses. By the end of their production run, the time taken between laying down the hull and launching the ship had been cut down to nearly one month. She was powered with two Skinner Unaflow reciprocating steam engines, which drove two shafts, providing , thus enabling her to make . Her compact size limited the length of the flight deck and necessitated the installment of an aircraft catapult at her bow, and there were two aircraft elevators to facilitate movement of aircraft between the flight and hangar deck: one each fore and aft.

One /38 caliber dual-purpose gun was mounted on the stern. Anti-aircraft defense was provided by eight Bofors  anti-aircraft guns in single mounts, as well as twelve Oerlikon  cannons, which were mounted around the perimeter of the deck. By the end of the war, Casablanca-class carriers had been modified to carry thirty  cannons, and the number of Bofors  guns had been doubled to 16, by putting them into twin mounts. These modifications were in response to increasing casualties due to kamikaze attacks. Although Casablanca-class escort carriers were designed to function with a crew of 860 and an embarked squadron of 50 to 56, the exigencies of wartime often necessitated the inflation of the crew count. Casablanca-class escort carriers were designed to carry 27 aircraft, but the hangar deck could accommodate more, which was often necessary during transport or especially training missions, due to the constant turnover of pilots and aircraft.

Construction
Her construction was awarded to Kaiser Shipbuilding Company, Vancouver, Washington, under a Maritime Commission contract, on 18 June 1942. The escort carrier was laid down on 19 March 1943 under the name Emperor, with the intention of transferring her to the Royal Navy under Lend-Lease. She was laid down as MC hull 1104, the thirteenth of a series of fifty Casablanca-class escort carriers. On 28 June 1943, with the   having been designated to be transferred in her place, Emperor was redesignated as an auxiliary aircraft carrier and therefore received the hull symbol ACV-67, indicating that she was the sixty-seventh escort carrier to be commissioned into the United States Navy. As a part of this change, she was also renamed to Nassuk Bay, as part of a tradition which named escort carriers after bays or sounds in Alaska. On 15 July, with the handover of Pybus having been completed, she was redesignated as an escort carrier and received her final hull symbol of CVE-67. She was launched on 6 October 1943; sponsored by Mrs. F. J. McKenna; transferred to the Navy, renamed to Solomons as part of a new naval policy which named subsequent Casablanca-class carriers after naval or land engagements, and commissioned on 21 November 1943, with Captain Marion Edward Crist in command.

Service history

Upon being commissioned, Solomons underwent a shakedown cruise in the area between Puget Sound and Astoria, Oregon, conducting tests, evaluations, and training exercises for four weeks. She left Astoria on 20 December, making a stop at Alameda, California on 23 December, and arriving at San Diego on 25 December. There, after conducting some more exercises, she departed for Pearl Harbor on 30 December. On 6 January 1944, she took on a load of passengers, supplies, as well as dysfunctional aircraft to be taken to the West Coast for repairs or salvage. She left on 9 January, arriving back at San Diego on 14 January. For the rest of January, she conducted battle practices off of southern California. She left San Diego with a load of aircraft on 30 January for the East Coast. As she approached the Panama Canal, her aircraft participated in a simulated aerial attack on the canal in order to test its defenses. She stopped at Balboa, Panama on 9 February, where she embarked passengers, and departed on 11 February, arriving at the naval station in Norfolk, Virginia, on 16 February.

At Norfolk, Solomons took on her aircraft contingent of Composite Squadron (VC) 9, supplies, and aviation stores, before putting out to sea on 21 March for Brazil. She arrived at Recife on 13 April, and upon arriving, joined the United States Fourth Fleet for anti-submarine duties in the South Atlantic, under the command of Vice admiral Jonas H. Ingram. On 14 April, she began her first anti-submarine patrol. Her first patrol, which lasted until 30 April, proved to be uneventful. The only indications of possible contact were some green flares spotted on the morning of 22 April, as well as some unsuccessful Hedgehog attacks on a signature that might have been  Her second patrol, from 4 May to 20 May, had even less activity.

Solomons departed Recife for her third patrol on 30 May. A submarine had been spotted off of Salvador proceeding to the northeast, and the task group was dispatched after it, without any results. The task group spent the front half of its patrol chasing several signature reports, including one about a Japanese flying boat, but with no results. However, high-frequency direction finding had picked up a lead of a U-boat off of southwestern Africa heading on a northwesterly course on 9 June. Thus, the task group went to the northeast, in a direction to possibly intercept.

In the midst of her patrol, on 15 June, one of VC-9's Avenger torpedo bombers, piloted by Ens. The Avenger proceeded towards the contact, and there was no further word relayed back. The Avenger immediately made four attack runs against U-860, and was shot down by antiaircraft fire on the fourth run, killing all three of the Avenger's crew. However, the Avenger had managed to inflict enough damage on the submarine such that it could not safely dive, something that would later prove fatal for U-860. It was not until 14:00 that a group was cobbled together on Solomons to investigate Chamberlain's report. Two of Solomonss screening vessels, the destroyer escorts Straub and Herzog, were immediately dispatched to Avery's contact. As the Avenger moved closer, the gunners on U-860 threw up a screen of flak, convincing Avery to wait for reinforcements. As Avery was transmitting his contact report back, two Wildcat fighters and one Avenger were preparing to land on Solomons, having been unsuccessful in spotting any targets. Upon receiving the news, the three aircraft turned around and headed to join Avery.

The three aircraft rendezvoused with Avery, and a series of three organized attacks were planned, which were launched at 19:46, under the waning evening sun. In the first attack, U-860 was first strafed by the two Wildcats piloted by Ens. T.J. Wadsworth and Ens. R.E. McMahon, whilst the submarine moved in evasive circles, unable to dive. Hits were observed on the submarine's deck, conning tower, and bandstand. The two Avengers, piloted by Avery and Ens. M.J. Spear, followed up with rockets as the Wildcats were being harried by flak. The pilots of VC-9 had been trained to aim their rockets to hit to the fore of the conning tower, where the most vulnerable systems laid.

Following this attack, U-860 started to slow down, and turned southwards. At 17:51, two more aircraft arrived on the scene, two Avengers, one piloted by Lieutenant, junior grade W.F. Chamberlain, and one piloted by Lieutenant, junior grade D.E. Weigle. The two aircraft immediately engaged U-860, with McMahon's Wildcat making another strafing run to try to suppress antiaircraft fire. In the second attack, Weigle, running in from the fore, fired eight rockets, six of which connected in the area to the fore of the conning tower. Following this run, U-860 slowed down to just a crawl, at only . In the third, and final attack, Chamberlain, charging from the port, dropped two depth charges directly forward of the conning tower whilst Lt. Cdr. Avery strafed U-860 to suppress antiaircraft fire. However, Chamberlain proceeded much too low, dropping the depth charges only  over the submarine. The explosions rocked his aircraft, starting a fire in the bomb bay and in the central cockpit. Chamberlain maintained a semblance of control, and came to a relatively soft landing  to the starboard of the sinking U-boat. U-860 sank after this last attack, at 19:53, with 42 of her crew going down with the ship.

Straub and Herzog arrived during the night. Under the darkness, the two destroyers were forced to rely heavily upon Solomons aircraft, which fired starshells and dropped flares. First, they attempted to recover Chamberlain and his crew, but were unable to find any trace of them. They then proceeded to the submarine's wreck, where Straub began rescuing survivors, whilst Herzog provided a screen. Straub eventually recovered 21 crewmen, including U-860s commander, Fregattenkapitän Paul Büchel. One of the survivors was resuscitated only after twenty minutes of artificial respiration. Solomons continued her third patrol until 23 June, when she returned to Recife to refuel and to disembark the captured German sailors.

Following a fourth anti-submarine patrol, as well as a stop at Rio de Janeiro, Solomons sailed back north to Naval Station Norfolk, arriving on 24 August. She moored at Norfolk for a month before heading for Staten Island, New York, docking there on 25 September. She took on a load of 150 army airmen along with their P-47 Thunderbolt fighters, and departed on 6 October, on a mission to ferry them to Casablanca, French Morocco. She was back at the East Coast on 7 November, anchored within Narrangansett Bay, Rhode Island.

For the rest of 1944, Solomons served as a training carrier, qualifying Navy and Marine pilots in carrier landings, initially off of Quonset Point. In January 1945, she steamed southwards to Port Everglades, Florida, where she continued to qualify pilots throughout the rest of 1945. At Port Everglades, Captain Richard Stanley Moss raised his flag over the vessel. For a week in December 1945, she was diverted from her mission to participate in a search for the 14 missing airmen of Flight 19, as well as the 13 airmen from a Martin PBM Mariner flying boat that went missing after being dispatched to look for Flight 19. On 15 February 1946, Captain Allen Smith Jr. took over command of the vessel.

Having finished her qualification duties, Solomons proceeded northwards to the naval shipyard at Boston, Massachusetts, where she was decommissioned, on 15 May, joining the Boston group of the Atlantic Reserve Fleet. She was struck from the Navy list on 5 June 1946, and she was sold for scrapping in December 1946 to the Patapsco Scrap Corp., headquartered at Bethlehem, Pennsylvania. She was delivered to its agent at Newport on 22 December. She was ultimately broken up in 1947.

Notes

References

Sources

Online sources

Bibliography

External links 

 

Casablanca-class escort carriers
World War II escort aircraft carriers of the United States
Cold War amphibious assault ships of the United States
Ships built in Vancouver, Washington
1943 ships
S4-S2-BB3 ships